The Best of Ray Charles is a compilation album released in 1970 on the Atlantic Jazz label, featuring previously released instrumental (non-vocal) tracks recorded by Ray Charles between November 1956 and November 1958.

The instrumental, "Rockhouse" would later be covered, as "Ray's Rockhouse" (1985), by The Manhattan Transfer with lyrics by Jon Hendricks.

Track listing
"Hard Times" (Mitchell) – 4:39
"Rockhouse" (Charles) – 3:50
"Sweet Sixteen Bars" (Charles) – 4:04
"Doodlin'" (Silver) – 5:49
"How Long Blues" (Carr) – 9:15
"Blues Waltz" (Charles) – 6:29

Personnel
"Hard Times"
Ray Charles – piano
David Newman – alto sax
Bennie Crawford – baritone sax
Marcus Belgrave – trumpet
Edgar Willis – bass
Milton Turner – drums
Recorded on November 5, 1958
Recording engineer: Tom Dowd
Produced by Nesuhi Ertegun and Jerry Wexler

"Rockhouse"
Tenor sax solo by David Newman
Other personnel not mentioned (possibly same as Track 4)
Produced by Ahmet Ertegun and Jerry Wexler

"Sweet Sixteen Blues"
Ray Charles – piano
Roosevelt Sheffield - bass
William Peeples – drums
Recorded on November 26, 1956
Recording engineers: Earle Brown and Tom Dowd
Produced by Nesuhi Ertegun and Jerry Wexler

"Doodlin'"
Ray Charles – piano
David Newman – tenor sax
Emmott Dennis – baritone sax
Joseph Bridgewater – trumpet
John Hunt – trumpet
Roosevelt Sheffield - bass
William Peeples – drums
Trumpet solo by John Hunt
Arranger: Quincy Jones
Recorded on November 26, 1956
Recording engineers: Earle Brown and Tom Dowd
Produced by Nesuhi Ertegun and Jerry Wexler

"How Long Blues"
Ray Charles – alto sax and piano
Milt Jackson – vibraharp (and piano during Ray Charles’ alto sax chorus and Pettiford’s first chorus on bass)
Billy Mitchell – tenor sax
Skeeter Best - guitar
Oscar Pettiford – bass
Connie Kay – drums
Recorded on September 12, 1957
Recording engineer: Tom Dowd
Produced by Nesuhi Ertegun

"Blues Waltz"
Ray Charles – piano
Bennie Crawford – baritone sax
David Newman – tenor sax
Lee Harper – trumpet
Marcus Belgrave - trumpet
Edgar Willis – bass
Richie Goldberg – drums
Recorded at the Newport Jazz Festival, Newport, Rhode Island, on July 5, 1958
Recording engineers: Harold Chapman and Tom Dowd
Produced by Nesuhi Ertegun

Other credits
Sleevenotes: Ralph J. Gleason
Cover photo: Ray Ross
Cover design: Loring Eutemey

Chart positions

References

Atlantic Records 1543

1970 greatest hits albums
Albums produced by Jerry Wexler
Albums produced by Nesuhi Ertegun
Ray Charles compilation albums
Albums produced by Ahmet Ertegun